Nero and Zero was a comic strip originally in the boys' story paper The Wizard, published by DC Thomson. This strip started on 1 November 1930  and was originally drawn by Allan Morley. The strip featured the subtitle the "Rollicking Romans"  and featured two bumbling Roman guards called Nero and Zero who guarded Caesar. The strip lasted in the Wizard for ten years. The strip also appeared in The Beezers first issue.

The strip was later resurrected for the Buzz comic and the pair featured in the first issue. This strip was drawn by Tom Bannister and lasted until issue 40.

It also appeared in The Sunday Post for several years.

References

DC Thomson Comics strips
British comics characters
British comic strips
Comic strip duos
Gag-a-day comics
Fictional ancient Romans
Fictional soldiers
1930 comics debuts
1940 comics endings
Comics set in ancient Rome
Comics set in the 1st century BC
Comics characters introduced in 1930